is a manga series by Hisaichi Ishii.

Anime

TV series
A 103-episode anime television series was produced for the Fuji TV network and aired from 28 September 1980 to 10 October 1982 with each episode containing 3 7-minute stories. The series aired on Sunday nights from 7:00 to 7:30.

Staff
Director: Hiromitsu Furukawa
Planning: Hiro Akieda
Producer: Tadami Watanabe
Executive Producer: Kōichi Sasaki
Chief Director: Hiroyoshi Mitsunobu
Animation Director: Hiroshi Kanazawa
Screenplay: Hiroshi Kaneko, Tamiko Baba, Tomoko Kanahara
Original Creator: Hisaichi Ishii
Art Director: Mariko Kadono

Cast
Yoshio Yamada: Columbia Top
Yoshida: Yasushi Suzuki
Noboru: Kenbō Kaminarimon
Ine: Reiko Susuki
Minoru: Yūko Maruyama
Yoneo: Mitsuo Senda
Yoneko: Emiko Yokoyama
Shigeru: Junji Nishino
Sanae: Akie Yasuda
Fukuda: Yō Yoshimura

Film
An anime film produced by Nihon Herald Pictures was released into Herald Enterprise theaters on 14 March 1981.

Staff
Director: Hiromitsu Furukawa
Planning: Hiro Akieda
Producer: Tadami Watanabe
Executive Producer: Kōichi Sasaki
Chief Director: Hiroyoshi Mitsunobu
Animation Director: Hiroshi Kanazawa
Screenplay: Hiroshi Kaneko, Tamiko Baba, Tomoko Kanahara
Original Creator: Hisaichi Ishii
Art Director: Mariko Kadono

Cast
Yoshio Yamada: Columbia Top
Yoshida: Yasushi Suzuki
Noboru: Kenbō Kaminarimon
Ine: Reiko Susuki
Minoru: Yūko Maruyama
Yoneo: Mitsuo Senda
Yoneko: Emiko Yokoyama

Sources:

References

1979 manga
1980 anime television series debuts
1981 anime films
1982 Japanese television series endings
Anime series based on manga
Comedy anime and manga
Animated films based on manga
Fuji TV original programming
Hisaichi Ishii
Japanese animated films
1980s Japanese-language films
Manga adapted into films
Slice of life anime and manga